WNFK (92.1 FM) is a radio station broadcasting a classic rock format. Licensed to Perry, Florida, United States, the station serves the Tallahassee area.  The station is currently owned by Fred Dockins, through licensee Dockins Communications, Inc.

History
The station went on the air as WPCI on August 14, 1985.  On June 16, 1986, the station changed its call sign to the current WNFK.

Previous logo

References

External links

NFK
Radio stations established in 1991
1991 establishments in Florida